Copper(I) thiocyanate (or cuprous thiocyanate) is a coordination polymer with formula CuSCN. It is an air-stable, white solid used as a precursor for the preparation of other thiocyanate salts.

Structure 
At least two polymorphs have been characterized by X-ray crystallography. They both feature copper(I) in a characteristic tetrahedral coordination geometry. The sulfur end of the SCN- ligand is triply bridging so that the coordination sphere for copper is CuS3N.

Synthesis 
Copper(I) thiocyanate forms from the spontaneous decomposition of black copper(II) thiocyanate, releasing thiocyanogen, especially when heated. It is also formed from copper(II) thiocyanate under water, releasing (among others) thiocyanic acid and the highly poisonous hydrogen cyanide. It is conveniently prepared from relatively dilute solutions of copper(II) in water, such as copper(II) sulphate. To a copper(II) solution sulphurous acid is added and then a soluble thiocyanate is added (preferably slowly, while stirring). Copper(I) thiocyanate is precipitated as a white powder. Alternatively, a thiosulfate solution may be used as a reducing agent.

Double salts 
Copper(I) thiocyanate forms one double salt with the group 1 elements, CsCu(SCN)2. The double salt only forms from concentrated solutions of CsSCN, into which CuSCN dissolves. From less concentrated solutions, solid CuSCN separates reflecting its low solubility. When brought together with potassium, sodium or barium thiocyanate, and brought to crystallisation by concentrating the solution, mixed salts will crystallise out. These are not considered true double salts. As with CsCu (SNC)2, copper(I) thiocyanate separates out when these mixed salts are redissolved or their solutions diluted.

Uses 
Copper(I) thiocyanate is a hole conductor, a semiconductor with a wide band gap (3.6 eV, therefore transparent to visible and near infrared light). It is used in photovoltaics in some third-generation cells as a hole transfer layer. It acts as a P-type semiconductor and as a solid-state electrolyte. It is often used in dye-sensitized solar cells. Its hole conductivity is however relatively poor (0.01 S·m−1). This can be improved by various treatments, e.g. exposure to gaseous chlorine or doping with (SCN)2.

CuSCN with NiO act synergically as a smoke suppressant additive in polyvinyl chloride (PVC).

CuSCN precipitated on carbon support can be used for conversion of aryl halides to aryl thiocyanates.

Copper thiocyanate is used in some anti-fouling paints. Advantages compared to cuprous oxide include that the compound is white and a more efficient biocide.

References 

Copper(I) compounds
Thiocyanates
Semiconductor materials
Coordination polymers